Hanover Community School Corporation is a school district in Lake County, Indiana.

References

External links
 

School districts in Indiana
Education in Lake County, Indiana
School districts established in 1969
1969 establishments in Indiana